Hezar Kanian (also Romanized as Hezār Kānīān) is a city and the center of Saral Rural District, Saral District, Divandarreh County, Kurdistan Province, Iran. At the 2016 census, its population was 544, in 115 families. The village is populated by Kurds. Hezar Kanian is labeled as city since 2020 and has a fast pace of growing in the main areas of agriculture. The location of the new city of Hezar Kanian can be explained and analyzed in many points, but four points: access location, geomorphological construction, economic foundations and population strategies, are more effective for the development of such settlements, which if the right policies are adopted, it will cause the physical development of this new city. It is emphasized again that it is necessary to provide the ground for the sustainability of the population with a new functional definition and diversification of the urban economy.

Religion and believes 
Population of the city is totally Muslim, Sunni and believed in Imam Shafeii. This city has one big mosque named 'Haj Sheikh Hossein' which he was one of the main contributor of the city and also former Imam of the village for a few years ago.

References 

Towns and villages in Divandarreh County
Kurdish settlements in Kurdistan Province